Sanctum 2 is a first-person shooter tower defense video game, developed by independent developer Coffee Stain Studios for Microsoft Windows, OS X, Linux, PlayStation 3 and Xbox 360. The successor to Sanctum, Sanctum 2 was announced in 2012 and released on 15 May 2013.

Setting
Sanctum 2 takes place in the future on the planet Loek-III where a major human colony has been established by the Britech Foundation in the city of Elysion-1, a vast elegant metropolis. A previous arboreal settlement, Brightholme, had been set up in the wilderness but had collapsed from repeated attacks by the Lumes, a race of diverse creatures native to the planet. It is hinted that some settlers still survive in the ruins of Brightholme and are part of an obscure organisation known as Tsygan, which is opposed to the vast, almost governmental power that Britech holds. Tsygan is a minority compared to the "Brightsiders" – those who side with Britech. Key to the colonies' survival are Cores, which appear as large blue spheres of energy. They convert inert gases like nitrogen into oxygen, and cleanse areas of toxic mushroom-like spores native to Loek-III, which are linked to Lume activity.

The Lumes, which are hostile to Cores, propagate large plant-like access shafts until they are close to a Core, and then launch a coordinated attack on the Core until it is destroyed. If successful, the area will become swamped with poisonous spores. To counter the Lumes, the Britech Foundation has created and armed a military wing known as the Core Guardians, who are tasked to defend the Cores using their arsenal of weapons and defensive towers. The war between Britech and the Lumes has been going on and off for an indeterminate amount of time.

The player takes control of one of four Core Guardians in the game, and it is shown they travel together as a squad. Skye Autumn, the player character of the first game; and Sweet Autumn, Skye's younger sister; both follow on from their father, who was killed in action. Haigen Hawkins is a former Brightholme slum dweller who somehow managed to make it to Elysion-1 and join the military. SiMo, a robot designed to aid the Core Guardians, is the fourth character.

Plot
While reporting back to duty, the Core Guardians are suddenly alerted to a major attack on the Facility – a major research centre, industrial development, and city in its own right. Skye takes a drop pod down to a Britech manufacturing and research centre in the middle of a Lume attack, which she defeats. After the Core Guardians regroup, they fend off Lume attacks on the park of a nearby hotel, a research lab, and eventually the main entrance to the facility centre.
After fending off the final wave, which included a dangerous boss called a Walker Patriarch, the Core Guardians are ordered to travel to the nearby rocky fields area, named after its distinctive karst topography. Following their successful defence of the initial core, they are ordered to travel to three other outposts to defend their cores. Eventually, they reach the farthest outpost and receive the true intention of their mission: to reach the ruins of Brightholme and find an abandoned lab containing details on the origin of the attacks.

Because of the high spore content of the area, the Core Guardians must travel from old Core site to old Core site, each time activating them to sterilise spores and defending the ensuing Lume attack. Upon finding the lab, it is discovered that the use of the Cores caused an overall increase in spore production, leading to an increase in Lumes. Skye and Haigen decide to keep the data from Britech and instead transmit it to Tsygan, whom they believe would make better use thereof.

Off the radar, the Core Guardians then follow the fault lines of earthquakes, which travel in an arc through the areas they have defended. Using the stolen information, they also discover a massive cavern beneath the original facility, which seems to be artificial but has no link to the surface. After trekking through the swamp, they eventually find a massive cavern with a Lume of incredible size (previously shown in the distance in the Sanctum level Aftershock) that releases a torrent of Lumes. The beast, which is the presumed source of the Lume attacks, earthquakes and caverns, fails to destroy the Core, and so instead destroys the area and travels to the surface.

The Core Guardians escape its wrath and reach the surface to see it, in full height and gargantuan size, marching towards the skyscrapers of Elysion 1 with a cohort of Lumes. As the credits roll, the barrage of missiles and lasers from the Elysion 1 defences seem ineffective against the beast, and the players are left on a cliffhanger.

Reception
Sanctum 2 received mostly positive reviews from critics. The game holds an aggregated Metacritic score of 77/100 for Microsoft Windows, based on 28 critic reviews, and for Xbox 360, based on 12 critic reviews.

References

External links
 

2013 video games
First-person shooters
Indie video games
Coffee Stain Studios games
Tower defense video games
Unreal Engine games
Video games developed in Sweden
Video games featuring female protagonists
Video games set on fictional planets
Video game sequels
Windows games
MacOS games
Linux games
PlayStation 3 games
PlayStation Network games
Xbox 360 games
Xbox 360 Live Arcade games
Multiplayer and single-player video games